Discotettix is a genus of pygmy grasshoppers (Orthoptera: Tetrigidae) found in Malesia, Brunei, Indonesia and the Philippines.  They are commonly known as spiky pygmy devils. After revision of this genus, from being the type genus of the subfamily Discotettiginae, it is now placed in the tribe Scelimenini.

Species 
The Orthoptera Species File lists:
 Discotettix (Discotettix) aruanus Skejo, Pushkar & Tumbrinck, 2022
 Discotettix (Discotettix) belzebuth (Serville, 1838) - type species (as D. armatus Costa, 1864)
 another synonym: Discotettix adenanii Mahmood, Idris & Salmah, 2007
 Discotettix (Discotettix) doriae Bolívar, 1898
 Discotettix (Discotettix) kirscheyi Skejo, Pushkar, Tumbrinck & Tan, 2022
 Discotettix (Discotettix) selysi Bolívar, 1887
 synonym: Discotettix selangori Mahmood, Idris & Salmah, 2007
 Discotettix (Discotettix) sumatrensis Skejo, Pushkar & Tumbrinck, 2022
 Discotettix (Mnesarchus) scabridus (Stål, 1877)

 Discotettix shelfordi Hancock, 1907 was previously assigned to this genus but is now moved into its own genus, Disconius Skejo, Pushkar & Tumbrinck, 2022

References 

Caelifera genera
Tetrigidae
Insects of Asia